There are five ecotourism Pan-European routes crossing 35 countries in Europe and connecting natural parks (national parks and regional parks) to heritage sites chosen by UNESCO, as well as to the biosphere reserves (MAB).

Each of these five routes presents European culture in the same way as the historical routes such as Way of Saint James, the Silk Road which connects Europe to Asia, Route 66 which crosses the United States, and the Pan-American Highway which goes from Alaska to Ushuaia.

The routes are intended to help travelers discover natural, cultural sites, pilgrims, and regional specialties etc.

History

1995 
The European Federation of the Mountain (EFM), concerned with the rural development of its territories, asked a qualified consultant to represent it at an OECD workshop (Organisation for Economic Cooperation and Development) which was devoted to the research of "the niche markets and rural development."

20 country members of the Organization and the Council of Europe were represented to discuss the proposals from three experts from the private sectors and five consultants from the Expert Committee Initiative Leader Europe.

The editions of the OECD No. 48256 1995 published the summary of this workshop. In Chapter 5, Pierre Guerry, consultant of the Federation, presents the two new axes that should be considered to ensure the balanced regional development of the rural areas: Quality Certification and Designations of Origin.

Given the difficulty of selling local products (although these products are all attached to the same territory, they often don't have other links between them), the consultant proposed to promote the regional specialties of each territory together with its natural and cultural heritages. He considered that the reputation of the natural and cultural heritages could promote the qualified products that claim to territorial identity. These "home sites" cannot generate a large turnover, but they can create a permanent flow of visitors who renewed to research some regional specialties in memory of their stay or passage.

The consultant's proposal was therefore to create a European network of natural and cultural heritages and regional crafts to visit, promoted at the European level to develop a sustainable rural economy. The target clientele will be European residents and visitors from other continents, sensitive to the environmental preservation, local cultures and traditions, including regional specialties.

1998 
The division "ecological science" of UNESCO supports this private initiative by offering 120 MAB (man and biosphere) accredited by this organization and 250 national parks in Europe, representative of the natural heritage of the main regions. The MAB, national and regional parks are interconnected to form the network of the ecotourism pan-European routes.

The consultant asked the PhD students of the Alpine Geography Institute of Grenoble to establish a first map of this network, called the "European Touring Nature Map". The direction of this UNESCO Division gave written permission to the consultant to affix its logo on the European map.

2000 
A first test was executed in the Aosta Valley in Italy with the European Regional Development Fund (ERDF) DG XVI at that time. On this occasion the European foldable map in four languages was published in 1000 copies. On the back of the map, 51 local professionals were presented and located to facilitate the travelers' visits.

2002 
The tourism expert of the United Nations Environment Programme (UNEP), after several hearings, responded favorably to the ten questions used expertise of this private initiative.

2005 
A second test was executed in the region of Lake Tisza in Hungary. The jury was with the Sweden president of the group "Rural Economy and Sustainable Tourism" from the Assembly of European Regions, an NGO with a membership of 270 regions in Europe.

Four counties, 73 villages and 150 local professionals participated in the test and signed the project charter to preserve their local environment, natural, cultural heritage and regional specialties. On this occasion, 5000 maps in two languages were published. These maps had a first layout of the five European routes, Atlantic, Mediterranean, Nordic, Central and Western route. Approved by the rural tourism group of the Assembly of European Regions, the route map took the following denomination: Touring Nature, the Pan European Routes to rural tourism (based on the village + sustainable development European label).

The Minister of Planning and Hungarian Tourism gave a press conference before a dozen journalists from the print and two television channels. He considered this private initiative as an example to follow for all the regional territories in Europe wishing to promote their specificities.

2007 
The Assembly of European Regions presented the project to EU funding to enable that the local authorities could co-finance this project to create quickly this network. The enlargement of the European Union imposed other funding priorities in view of the enlargement of the Union to ten new states. The project could not continue to be financed from the European fund, and thus the consultant who is also the project initiative chose to continue to fund its development with his own funding.

2010 
The consultant who had organized several trips to the United States favored the transfers of experience on the European project. Indeed, the US attracts 280 million visitors every year to visit the 300 sites represented on a map (National Park System Map), which covers 391 US regions of the US. 10% of the visitors are not resident on this continent. The MAB and World Heritage labeled by UNESCO are the "home sites" which attract at once the hikers and the campers. To provide the visitors with the various services, NPS signed the contracts with 630 private companies, mainly SMEs of local products, accommodations and sports activities.

Therefore, the MAB and the natural sites labeled by UNESCO in Europe can also become the "home sites" for all visitors. The strategy of the consultant, favorable to the development of a local rural economy, was confirmed by UNESCO who has selected the "home sites" for the ecotourism pan-European routes.

2013 
The ecotourism pan-European routes finalized the layout of the five routes across 36 countries, 230 regions, 154 stages and 180 sub-steps.

It proposed another way to discover Europe.

2015 
It was proposed to all the regional specialties manufacturers in Europe to be referenced on the ecotourism pan-European routes that geo locate "1000 ecotourism attractions to visit in Europe: natural, cultural and handicraft." Thus the main manufacturing sites of the regional specialties from the 36 countries can contribute to the financing of these routes, which are transferring the North Americans' expertise who have proved its success. They support also the development of the local economy, which in turn promote the awareness of local products.

An application and a dynamic website are being created to make sure the localization of the regional specialties manufacturers referenced at the European level. The visitors can also operate easily with their mobile phones and tablets to organize their trips.

The five ecotourism pan-European routes

The Mediterranean route (about 8000 km) 
This route has a variety of terrain including blue waters, marine coasts and creeks, caves, beaches, and southern market places. The streets have a warm and lively atmosphere where traditional festivals take place. For centuries, Mediterranean Europe has attracted Greek and Roman civilizations birthplace and mythology lovers.

This route crosses 10 countries.
  : 1 stage, 1 region
  : 6 stages, 12 sub-steps, 3 regions, 8 natural parks, 12 UNESCO sites, 3 pilgrimage sites
  : 1 stage, 1 UNESCO site
  : 4 stages, 15 sub-steps, 3 regions, 9 natural parks, 8 UNESCO sites, 6 pilgrimage sites
  : 9 stages, 16 sub-steps, 12 regions, 21 natural parks, 22 UNESCO sites, 6 pilgrimage sites
  : 1 stage, 5 sub-steps, 4 regions, 5 natural parks, 6 UNESCO sites
  : 1 stage, 1 sub-step, 1 region, 1 natural park, 1 UNESCO site, 2 pilgrimage sites
  : 1 stage, 1 sub-step, 1 region, 2 natural parks, 1 UNESCO site
  : 2 stages, 6 sub-steps, 6 regions, 1 natural park, 2 UNESCO sites
 : 1 stage, 5 sub-steps, 3 regions, 5 natural parks, 4 UNESCO sites

The Atlantic route (about 8300 km) 
This route lets North and South Americans get to know the origins of their culture and history. It is a way to discover in a short time the different European lifestyles: the typical Anglo-Saxon life of the Irish, the Scottish, the Welsh and the English, French gastronomy, the late evenings and the animated Southern European villages, Spain and Portugal.

This route crosses five countries.
  : 3 stages, 11 sub-steps, 3 regions, 5 natural parks, 7 UNESCO sites, 1 pilgrimage site
  : 3 stages, 13 sub-steps, 4 regions, 8 natural parks, 4 UNESCO sites, 3 pilgrimage sites
  : 11 stages, 34 sub-steps, 7 regions, 12 natural parks, 4 UNESCO sites, 10 pilgrimage sites
  : 9 stages, 28 sub-steps, 17 regions, 16 natural parks, 14 UNESCO sites, 1 pilgrimage site
  : 3 stages, 13 sub-steps, 3 regions, 4 natural parks, 1 UNESCO site, 1 pilgrimage site

The Nordic route (about 11500 km) 
This route crosses the countries extraordinarily rich in historical castles, large cathedrals, churches and museums. It will take visitors to the champagne and Beaujolais road in France and to the famous windmills of the Netherlands. In the great outdoors one can discover countless lakes in Finland, fjords in Norway, and immense forests of Sweden. The northern route returns to the heart of Europe through the Baltic countries. One can find cosmopolis full of history, architecture, culture and nightlife.

This route crosses 13 countries.
  : 6 stages, 20 sub-steps, 4 regions, 9 natural parks, 7 UNESCO sites, 5 pilgrimage sites
 : 1 stage, 5 sub-steps, 3 regions, 1 natural park, 8 UNESCO sites, 1 pilgrimage site
 : 3 stages, 13 sub-steps, 8  regions, 9 natural parks, 6 UNESCO sites, 1 pilgrimage site
 : 3 stages, 9 sub-steps, 3 regions, 7 natural parks, 3 UNESCO sites, 1 pilgrimage site
 : 1 stage, 1 sub-step, 1 region, 1 UNESCO site
 : 4 stages, 10 sub-steps, 4 regions, 6 natural parks, 4 UNESCO sites
 : 6 stages, 8 sub-steps, 4 regions, 8 natural parks, 4 UNESCO sites, 1 pilgrimage site
 : 7 stages, 14 sub-steps, 7 regions, 14 natural parks, 4 UNESCO sites
 : 2 stages, 5 sub-steps, 6 regions, 3 natural parks, 1 UNESCO site
 : 1 stage, 6 sub-steps, 2 regions, 2 natural parks, 1 UNESCO site
 : 1 stage, 4 sub-steps, 2 regions, 5 natural parks, 1 pilgrimage site
 : 1 stage
 : 3 stages, 6 sub-steps, 1 region, 1 natural park, 2 UNESCO sites, 1 pilgrimage site

The Occidental route (about 10400 km) 
This route crosses the countries where historical events are still deeply rooted in people's minds. One can re-discover these countries with their natural and cultural heritages: from the Carpathians Mountains, the Great Plain in Hungary to Danube River which flows into Black Sea, the landscapes change so fast. The route lets visitors discover the wealth of the architectural heritage and the artistic talents - music, painting, and writing, which strengthen the authenticity of the folklore and the local traditions in these countries. One can also discover the must-see natural sites in Switzerland and the Alps with the Mont Blanc.

This route crosses 14 countries.
  : 5 stages, 22 sub-steps, 2 regions, 10 natural parks, 2 UNESCO sites, 8 pilgrimage sites
  : 3 stages, 7 sub-steps, 3 regions, 8 natural parks, 3 UNESCO sites, 5 pilgrimage sites
  : 1 stage, 7 sub-steps, 8 regions, 1 natural park, 2 UNESCO sites, 2 pilgrimage sites
  : 1 stage, 4 sub-steps, 1 region, 1 natural park, 1 UNESCO site, 3 pilgrimage sites
  : 3 stages, 7 sub-steps, 3 regions, 2 natural parks, 5 UNESCO sites, 3 pilgrimage sites
   : 1 stage, 5 sub-steps, 5 regions, 1 natural park, 6 UNESCO sites, 1 pilgrimage site
  : 2 stages, 2 sub-steps, 2 regions, 3 natural parks, 2 UNESCO sites, 1 pilgrimage site
  : 1 stage, 2 sub-steps, 2 regions, 1 natural park, 2 UNESCO sites
  : 1 stage, 1 sub-step, 1 region, 1 natural park
  : 2 stages, 5 sub-steps, 5 regions, 5 natural parks, 3 UNESCO sites, 2 pilgrimage sites
  : 5 stages, 10 sub-steps, 4 regions, 11 natural parks, 4 UNESCO sites
  : 3 stages, 7 sub-steps, 1 region, 2 natural parks, 1 UNESCO site
  : 5 stages, 10 sub-steps, 13 regions, 2 natural parks, 5 UNESCO sites, 1 pilgrimage site
  : 2 stages, 3 sub-steps, 1 region, 1 UNESCO site, 1 pilgrimage site

The Central route (about 7200 km) 
This route crosses the northern Great Plain with vast forests to bring visitors  then to the Czech mountain ranges with their lovely folklore. Then it lets one discover the fantastic landscapes of Poland and Belarus.  The central route ends in Moscow.

This route crosses eight countries.
  : 6 stages, 18 sub-steps, 4 regions, 7 natural parks, 4 UNESCO sites, 11 pilgrimage sites
  : 4 sub-steps, 3 regions, 1 natural park, 1 UNESCO site, 1 pilgrimage site
  : 5 stages, 13 sub-steps, 6 regions, 3 natural parks, 14 UNESCO sites, 1 pilgrimage site
  : 1 stage, 2 sub-steps, 2 regions, 2 natural parks, 1 UNESCO site
  : 4 stages, 8 sub-steps, 5 regions, 7 natural parks, 5 UNESCO sites, 2 pilgrimage sites
  : 1 stage, 3 sub-steps, 3 regions, 2 natural parks, 2 UNESCO sites, 1 pilgrimage site
  : 2 stages, 1 sub-step, 2 regions
  : 5 stages, 7 sub-steps, 1 region, 2 natural parks, 7 UNESCO sites

Why to create the ecotourism pan-European routes? 
Europe possesses a particularly rich and diversified natural and cultural heritage which the whole world wants to know in a simple way.  The ecotourism pan-European routes give one an opportunity to discover these places:
 Scenic landscapes. One can find the protected flora and fauna in 350 natural reserves  which are connected to each other on formed routes of discovery in Europe
 The heritage sights of UNESCO and the various small local handcraft or craft industry in different regions.
 A large network of pilgrimage sites

Who created the ecotourism pan-European routes? 
It is a private initiative, but many international organizations were consulted and adhered to this initiative.

The UNESCO MAB 
The division Ecological Sciences MAB (Man and the Biosphere) of the UNESCO proposed a selection of the outstanding sites both for their landscapes or their qualified architectures and for the specificity of the local products.

The UNEP 
The coordination of the tourism program of the UNEP (United Nations Environmental Program) considered this international project very interesting for the sustainable tourism which attracts attention of the local professionals, travelers' transport networks, such as touring club, automobile club, and the associations for the recreational vehicle or for the hikers.

The AER 
The Assembly of European Regions, a NGO (NON-GOVERNMENTAL ORGANIZATION) consists of 250 regions of 35 countries, contributed to the plan of "The Ecotourism of Pan European routes" and to the charter reference for the local professionals. The plan and the charter were tested on 4 Counties of Hungary and on a Website where the visitors can find all the useful information such as where to stay, where to eat, where to go out, what to visit, and how to organize their own personalized journeys.

The OECD 
The workshops of the OECD (Organization for Economic Cooperation and Development) let 130 countries participate in exchanging ideas in the organization for the rural development. Pierre Guerry, consultant of this workshop as marketing expert, proposed an approach of ecotourism to promote the local products and the territorial specificities in the supranational level. Afterward, the approach was suggested to the institutional organizations.

See also

 Convention on Biological Diversity
 Ecological indicator
 European Cultural Route
 Rural tourism

References

External links
 The touringnature.com site
 The touringnature-blog.com site
 The aer.eu site
 The unep.org site
 The unesco.org site

Nature conservation organisations based in Europe
Ecotourism
Environment of Europe
Tourism in Europe